Michael Darren Tana (born ) is a New Zealand politician and trade union leader. He was mayor of Porirua from 2016 to 2019.

Early life 
Tana is from Matakohe, near Ruawai in the Northland region. His iwi are Ngāti Whātua and Ngāpuhi.

He has an agricultural science degree from Massey University.

Career 
He has been senior biosecurity adviser at the Ministry for Primary Industries, and the president of the 62,000-strong Public Service Association.

Career in politics
He announced in August 2016 that he would be running for Mayor of Porirua and he ran a poorly-funded campaign. Tana won the mayoral election, receiving 5,887 votes (after other candidates were eliminated on the STV ballot). He is the first Maori mayor of Porirua, and one of only a small number of Maori mayors in New Zealand history.

Tana grew up experiencing racism, and when he was elected Mayor he joined Porirua City up to an anti-racism campaign.

Personal life 
Tana has six children with his wife Toni.

References

External links

Year of birth missing (living people)
1960s births
Living people
Ngāpuhi people
Ngāti Whātua people
Māori mayors
Mayors of Porirua
Massey University alumni
People from the Northland Region
New Zealand trade union leaders
21st-century New Zealand politicians